Kosi or Koshi was one of the fourteen zones of Nepal until the restructure of zones to provinces. The headquarters of Kosi Zone was Biratnagar which was also its largest city. Other cities of Kosi Zone were Inaruwa, Dharan, Dhankutta, Jhumka, Duhabi and Itahari. Its main rivers were Arun, Tamor and Sapta Koshi.

Administrative subdivisions
Kosi was divided into six districts; since 2015 these districts have been redesignated as part of Province No. 1.

Famous and religious places
 Pindeswari Temple, Dharan
 Budha Subba Temple, Dharan
 Panchakanya Temple, Dharan
 Bishnupaduka Temple, Dharan
 Kali Mandir, Biratnagar
 Chintaangdevi Temple, Dhankuta
 Namaste Jharana, Vedetar
 Ramdhuni Mandir, Dhuni Ban
 Jhumkeshwar Mahadev, Jhumka
 Barahkshetra Mandir Barahachhetra
 Auliya Baba Mandir, Chatara
 Jabdi Mata Mandir, Pakali
 Betana Shimsar, Belbari

 Durgadevi Mandir, Laukahi

See also
 Development Regions of Nepal (Former)
 List of zones of Nepal (Former)
 List of districts of Nepal

References

 
Zones of Nepal
Koshi Province
2015 disestablishments in Nepal